The Butlin Baronetcy, of Harley Street in the Metropolitan Borough of St Marylebone, was a title in the Baronetage of the United Kingdom. It was created on 28 June 1911 for the physician Henry Butlin, considered the father of British head and neck surgery. The title became extinct on the death of the second Baronet in 1916.

Butlin baronets, of Harley Street (1911)
Sir Henry Trentham Butlin, 1st Baronet (1845–1912)
Sir Henry Guy Trentham Butlin, 2nd Baronet (1893–1916)

References

Extinct baronetcies in the Baronetage of the United Kingdom